Kristjan Makke (born March 12, 1981, in Kohtla-Järve, Estonia) is an Estonian professional basketballer. He is currently playing for TTÜ KK at the center/forward position.
Makke started his senior club career at the age of fifteen with "BC Kalev" in 1996. After that he attended high school and college in the United States. In 2001, he moved to Tallinna Kalev. He played there until December 2002 and then moved to Ehitustööriist where he spent the next season also. In 2004–05 Makke played for Audentese Ülikool and then signed with Nybit. After three seasons in the team Makke joined TTÜ KK. He is currently the captain of the team.

Kristjan Makke is also a member of the Estonia national basketball team and has been a member of the Estonian EuroBasket squad in 2003, 2007, and 2009.

Honours
 1997–98 Estonian League (BC Kalev)
 2001–02 Estonian Cup (Tallinna Kalev)
 2001–02 Estonian League (Tallinna Kalev)

References

External links 
 Profile at basket.ee 
 Profile at bbl.net

1981 births
Living people
BC Kalev/Cramo players
Estonian men's basketball players
Korvpalli Meistriliiga players
TTÜ KK players
Western Illinois Leathernecks men's basketball players
Sportspeople from Kohtla-Järve
Centers (basketball)
Power forwards (basketball)